The Dynamo Minor Arena is a sports venue in Moscow, Russia that is located near neighboring Dynamo Stadium.

Constructed in 1928, but renovated in 1979 in time for the 1980 Summer Olympics, it hosted the field hockey tournament.

The stadium is located in the Park of Sport Complex Dynamo along with Dynamo Grand Arena, Dynamo Manage (indoor field), Dynamo Hockey School, and other sports facilities.

References
1980 Summer Olympics official report. Volume 2. Part 1. pp. 76–9.

Venues of the 1980 Summer Olympics
Olympic field hockey venues
Sports venues built in the Soviet Union
Sports venues in Moscow
Sports venue